Tú eres un extraño (English: You're a stranger) is a Mexican telenovela produced by Televisa for Telesistema Mexicano in 1965.

Cast 
Luz María Aguilar
Eric del Castillo
Magda Donato
Angelines Fernández

References

External links 

Mexican telenovelas
1965 telenovelas
Televisa telenovelas
Spanish-language telenovelas
1965 Mexican television series debuts
1965 Mexican television series endings